is a Japanese actress. She is represented by the talent agency Plage.

Biography
Ishibashi was born as the second of three daughters of actors Ryo Ishibashi and Mieko Harada. She began classical ballet at the age of four and in 2009 went abroad to study at ballet schools in Boston and Calgary, before returning to Japan in 2013.

After her return, she was active as a contemporary dancer until she started acting in 2015. From January to April 2016, she appeared on stage in the Noda Hideki directed play Gekirin. In 2017, she had the leading role in Yuya Ishii's film The Tokyo Night Sky Is Always the Densest Shade of Blue. She won numerous awards for her role in the film, including the Blue Ribbon Award for Best Newcomer. Ishibashi's mother received the same award in 1976, marking the first time in Blue Ribbon's history that a parent and child received the same award.

Personal life
Ishibashi's older sister is a singer who releases music under the name Yuga. The two appeared together in a commercial for Uniqlo in 2017.

Appearances

Films

Television

Stage
Ginga Tetsudō no Yoru (ROGO, 2015)
Gekirin (NODA MAP, 2016)
Kosogi otoshi no akekure (BED&MAKINGS, 2019)
Bibi wo mita! (KAAT, 2019)

Music videos
"Furukotobumi" by Tamaki ROY (2017)

Songs
"Pretend" by The Mints (2018) - background vocals

Awards

References

External links

 
 
 Plage Talent Agency

1994 births
Living people
Actresses from Tokyo
Japanese female dancers
21st-century Japanese actresses
Japanese film actresses
Japanese stage actresses
Japanese television actresses